Alcatraz is a village in the eastern part of the island of Maio. The village is situated near the coast, 1 km north of Pilão Cão and 15 km northeast of the island capital Porto Inglês. In 2010 its population was 232.

See also
List of villages and settlements in Cape Verde

References
 

Villages and settlements in Maio, Cape Verde